Tadawale Sammat Wagholi is a small town and gram panchayat in Koregaon taluka, Satara district, in the Indian province of Maharashtra.

Tadawale Sammat Wagholi is a hill station situated strategically near Wathar Station, Koregaon on the Lonand-Satara Highway Road. Wathar Station is the main Market Place of North Koregaon Tehsil is closely situated here. Good highways like Phaltan-Satara and Lonand-Satara, State Railway Track is present at the Tadawale village. This village is also near to Pimpode Village, the biggest Market Place in North Koregaon Tehsil.

Government
Tadawale Sammat Wagholi is governed by a gram panchayat, whose head is elected by the villagers and is recognised as Sarpanch. Sapanch name is Nana Badhekar. Mrs Pansare is Panchayat samiti member.

Economy

Crops such as jawar, groundnut, harbhara, custard-apple, mango, bajra, and wheat are produced. The yield depends upon the nature of the monsoon.

Transport

Mostly local transport is done by Government buses & some private vehicles, auto rickshaws, two wheelers, nowadays roads are quite good.

Tadawale Sammat Wagholi is situated on the junction of two Highways viz. Satara-Lonand and Phaltan-Satara so it is connected to all major towns, market places and large cities in Maharashtra. Most of the people use bicycles or two wheelers as a mode of transportation. The village has no bus stand of its own yet in the inner parts in the village, so the people must have to go on the highway where the bus stop. A few private buses also have daily service to Pune and Mumbai and Major Maharashtriyan Cities every night with very affordable rates.

 Air: Nearest Airport is Phaltan but it is not in Use at about 26 km. So,Here Pune is affordable.
 Rail: Railway is ancient one here and it is on the Boundary of towns viz. Wathar & Tadawale.
 Road: Roads are quite good concludes two State Highways attached to Metropolitons in Maharashtra.

Sources
Satara District Gazzeteer.
Bharat Nirman Programme (Data Updated as of 01/04/05)
Department of Drinking Water Supply, Ministry of Rural Development, Government of India.

External links
ddws.nic.in school details
www.maharashtra.gov.in directory
www.maharashtra.gov.in Sataran
www.maharashtra.gov.in gazetteer

Cities and towns in Satara district
Villages in Satara district